Torkel Klingberg is a professor of cognitive neuroscience at the Karolinska Institutet in Stockholm, Sweden. He is the author of two books in Swedish, translated into English by Neil Betteridge, namely The Overflowing Brain: Information Overload and the Limits of Working Memory and The Learning Brain: Memory and Brain Development in Children. His research testing the hypothesis that playing memory games such as N-back also improves broader skills is controversial. He was one of the founders of Cogmed, but has currently no financial relationships with the company. He is executive director of Cognition Matters, a project that provides free digital cognitive training tools for children worldwide.

References 

Year of birth missing (living people)
Living people
Swedish neuroscientists
Academic staff of the Karolinska Institute